William Brown (born 9 October 1942) is a former Australian rules football player who played in the Victorian Football League (VFL) between 1963 and 1971 for the Richmond Football Club.

References 

 Hogan P: The Tigers Of Old, Richmond FC, Melbourne 1996

External links
 
 

Living people
Richmond Football Club players
Richmond Football Club Premiership players
Dandenong Football Club players
North Shore Australian Football Club players
Australian rules footballers from Victoria (Australia)
1942 births
Two-time VFL/AFL Premiership players